Appiness is a Canadian comedy film written, directed and produced by Eli Batalion. The film stars Eli Batalion as Eric Newman, who, upon being laid off from his stuffy corporate job, starts to pursue tech entrepreneurial start-up dreams with long-lost high school friend Raj Patel (Varun Saranga). The film premiered on the festival circuit in 2018, with its domestic premiere at the Rendez-vous Québec Cinéma in 2019.

Appiness was released by distributor Gravitas Ventures in early 2020.

Cast 
 Eli Batalion as Eric
 Varun Saranga as Raj
 Amber Goldfarb as Jeanine
 Kathleen Stavert as Nila
 Derek Johns as Jack
 Jayne Heitmeyer as Sierra
 Mike Paterson as Schlein
 Larry Day as Jeffrey
 Daniel Brochu as Chet

Awards

References

External links 
 
 
 

2018 films
2018 comedy films
Canadian comedy films
English-language Canadian films
2010s English-language films
2010s Canadian films